Alfred Neveu (24 December 1890, Leysin, Vaud - 20 May 1975) was a Swiss bobsledder who competed during the early 1920s. He won the gold medal in the four-man event at the 1924 Winter Olympics in Chamonix.

References
Wallenchinsky, David. (1984). "Bobsled: Four-Man". In The Complete Book the Olympics: 1896-1980. New York: Penguin Books. p. 559.

1890 births
1975 deaths
People from Aigle District
Bobsledders at the 1924 Winter Olympics
Swiss male bobsledders
Olympic medalists in bobsleigh
Medalists at the 1924 Winter Olympics
Olympic gold medalists for Switzerland
Sportspeople from the canton of Vaud
20th-century Swiss people